The Lady from the Sea is a 1929 British romance film directed by Castleton Knight and starring Ray Milland, Mona Goya, and Moore Marriott. A fisherman working off the Goodwin Sands becomes romantically attached to an upper-class woman. The film was also known as Goodwin Sands. The film was originally released as a silent film, but was re-released in a sound film version.

It was shot at Elstree Studios and originally released by Paramount British. The film's sets were designed by the art director J. Elder Wills.

Cast
Mona Goya as Claire le Grange 
Ray Milland as Tom Roberts 
Moore Marriott as Old Roberts 
Bruce Gordon as Dick Roberts 
Eugenie Amami as Rose 
Anita Graham as Mrs. Roberts 
Wilfred Shine as Doctor

References

Bibliography
 Low, Rachel. The History of British Film: Volume IV, 1918–1929. Routledge, 1997.
 McKay, James. Ray Milland: The Films, 1929-1984. McFarland, 2020.
 Wood, Linda. British Films, 1927-1939. British Film Institute, 1986.

External links

1929 films
Films shot at British International Pictures Studios
1920s romance films
Films directed by Castleton Knight
British black-and-white films
British romance films
Films set in Kent
British silent feature films
Transitional sound films
Paramount Pictures films
1920s English-language films
1920s British films